Mej Didi is a 2003 Bengali film directed by Shantimoy Bandyopadhyay and produced by Samrat Banerjee. The film is based on the novel of the same name by Sarat Chandra Chattopadhyay. It stars Debashree Roy in the titular role.

Cast
 Ranjit Mallick
 Debashree Roy
 Debraj Ray
 Chaitaly Chakraborty
 Manoj Mitra
 Ramaprasad Banik
 Chinmoy Roy
 Sambhu Bhattacharjya

Reception
The film was never received well by the critics. Ranjit Mallick's performance in the film was panned.

References

External links
 

2003 films
Bengali-language Indian films
2000s Bengali-language films